Carex acidicola is a tussock-forming species of perennial sedge in the family Cyperaceae.

See also
List of Carex species

References

acidicola
Plants described in 2002
Flora of Alabama
Flora of Georgia (U.S. state)